CARS24 is an Indian multinational online used car marketplace headquartered in Gurgaon. The company is considered among the four major organised players in the used car segment in India.

History

CARS24 was founded in 2015 by Vikram Chopra, Mehul Agrawal, Gajendra Jangid and Ruchit Agarwal as a platform to buy and sell used cars. In 2021, the company expanded operations internationally in several countries, including the United Arab Emirates, Thailand and Australia.  

The CARS24 platform facilitates the transaction and has an offline presence. Apart from selling used cars, the company's services include paperwork such as transferring the car to the name of the new owner which enables end-to-end transactions and offers an online auction platform to businesses looking to sell their pre-owned cars. In 2019 the company started offering verified used cars where the company offered a buyback guarantee on the vehicles verified by inspection.

The company operates 202 branches across 73 cities in India as of 2019. Apart from its own branches, the company has a tie up with more than 10,000 channel partners across 230 cities in India. The company touched 150,000 annual car sales in 2019.

In May 2020, the company launched CARS24 Moto. Cars24 Moto is a service which allows customers to sell used two wheelers such as motorbikes, mopeds and scooters on its platform. It also launched a service offering vehicles inspection services at the customers location in place of their branch.

Funding and endorsements

CARS24 raised US$50 million in Series A and Series B rounds combined. In 2018, it raised a further US$50 million in Series C round of funding.

CARS24 raised US$100 million in a Series D round of funding in 2019. Investors in the company include Sequoia Capital, Exor Seeds, partners of DST Global, Kingsway Capital, KCK and Unbound and Moore Strategic Ventures. As a part of the series D round of funding, the company received an investment from cricketer Mahendra Singh Dhoni, who simultaneously became the company's brand ambassador. Cars24 raised US$200 million in Series E round of funding in 2020 and became a unicorn startup as it was valued at over a $1 billion.

Apart from Dhoni, actors Boman Irani, Mandira Bedi and Nawazuddin Siddiqui have endorsed the company in commercial advertisements.

Cars24 became the primary and front-of-shirt sponsor of Sunrisers Hyderabad (SRH) for 2022 Indian Premier League. Cars24's sponsorship of SRH marks the first time that a company from the second-hand cars category has sponsored an IPL team.

Subsidiaries

The company established Cars24 Financial Services as a subsidiary in 2019. The company received an NBFC license from Reserve Bank of India in July 2019. Cars24 Financial Services provides consumer loan facilities to car dealers and end customers in the used car segment across 50 cities in India. In 2019-20 the company claimed to have disbursed loans worth .

References

Companies based in Gurgaon
Indian companies established in 2015
Indian brands
2015 establishments in Haryana
Online automotive companies
Used car market